Colin Pearson may refer to:
Colin Pearson, Baron Pearson (1899–1980), Canadian-born English lawyer and judge
Colin Pearson (potter) (1923–2007), English potter